Paul Berenberg (born 1716, died 1768) was a Hamburg merchant and banker and a member of the Berenberg banking family. He served as a Senator of Hamburg, succeeding his father Rudolf Berenberg.

His brothers were Rudolf Berenberg (1712–1761), merchant in Hamburg, Cornelius Berenberg (1714–1773), merchant in Livorno, and Johann Berenberg (1718–1772), merchant in Hamburg.

Literature
Joh. Berenberg, Gossler & Co.: Die Geschichte eines deutschen Privatbankhauses, Berenberg Bank, Hamburg 1990
Percy Ernst Schramm, Neun Generationen: Dreihundert Jahre deutscher Kulturgeschichte im Lichte der Schicksale einer Hamburger Bürgerfamilie (1648–1948). Vol. I and II, Göttingen 1963/64.

German bankers
German merchants
Senators of Hamburg (before 1919)
Paul
Berenberg Bank people
Grand burghers of Hamburg
1716 births
1768 deaths
18th-century German businesspeople